Most railway stations in Italy are maintained and operated by RFI, a subsidiary of Ferrovie dello Stato Group. A minor part of them are operated by private and regional companies, conceded by the state.

Stations by region
Lists of railway stations in Italy by region.

Classification
RFI classifies stations into Platinum, Gold, Silver and Bronze categories.

Platinum
Major stations with over 6,000 passengers per day. As major interchanges they will have many departures and arrivals daily, and  will be served by high-speed/long-distance services. They are the principal stations for the Italian cities they serve. They have the highest commercial potential (both fares and revenue from on-site merchants).

Bari Centrale
Bologna Centrale
Firenze Santa Maria Novella
Genova Piazza Principe
Genova Brignole
Milano Centrale
Milano Porta Garibaldi
Napoli Centrale
Padova
Palermo Centrale
Pisa Centrale
Roma Ostiense
Roma Termini
Roma Tiburtina
Torino Porta Nuova
Venezia Santa Lucia
Venezia Mestre
Verona Porta Nuova

Gold
Gold stations have high traffic levels. These include major urban inter-changes and stations serving large towns. They have a lower commercial potential.

Silver
This class includes all other small to medium-sized stations served by metropolitan and regional services. Some of these may be served by long-distance services.

Bronze
Small stations with low passenger numbers. This includes minor stations served by regional services.

Busiest stations

Operation
Grandi Stazioni is the commercial operator of 13 platinum-level railway stations. Centostazioni operates another 103 stations, including Milano Porta Garibaldi, Padova and Pisa Centrale. Both companies are owned by Ferrovie dello Stato.

See also

 Ferrovie dello Stato Italiane
 Rail transport in Italy
 List of railway stations

References

External links

Italian rail map at bueker.net

 
Railway stations